TBC Radio is a Christian radio station in Kingston, Jamaica, broadcasting on 88.5 MHz FM.  It is owned by Tarrant Baptist Church.

TBC Radio airs a variety of Christian programs including programs that are locally produced and syndicated programs such as Focus on the Family, Back to the Bible, and Unshackled!, as well as the Children's program Adventures in Odyssey.

References

External links
TBC Radio's website

Christian radio stations in North America
Radio stations in Jamaica
Radio stations established in 1998